Ummachu is a 1971 Indian Malayalam-language film, directed by P. Bhaskaran and produced by Tharachand Bharjathya. The film stars Madhu, Sheela, Adoor Bhasi and Master Sathyajith. It is an adaptation of Uroob's novel of the same name (1954). Uroob won the Kerala State Film Award for Best Story.

Plot

Cast 

Madhu as Mayan
Sheela as Ummachu
Adoor Bhasi
Master Sathyajith
T. R. Omana
Raghavan
Kunjava
Nellikode Bhaskaran as Beeran
Philomina
Santha Devi
Vidhubala (debut)
 Bahadoor
 Sankaradi
 C. A. Balan
 Haji Abdul Rahman
 Latheef
 Nambiar
 Abu
 Salam
 Krishnankutty
 Vasunni
 Chemancheri Narayanan Nair
 Haridas
 Master Krishnakumar
 Master Jayaraj
 Master Sathyajith
 Master Koyatti
 Master Abdul Nassar
 Kamala
 Thankam
 Baby Sobha
 Baby Aminu

Soundtrack 
The music was composed by K. Raghavan and the lyrics were written by P. Bhaskaran.

References

External links 
 

1970s Malayalam-language films
1971 films
Films based on Indian novels